Bokota may refer to:

 Bokota people, an ethnic group of Panama
 Bokota language, a language of Panama
 Dafni Bokota, Greek singer and presenter
 Labama Bokota, Rwandan footballer